A Scratch test may refer to:

 The skin allergy test used in the medical diagnosis of allergies
 Scratch hardness tests, such as Mohs scale of mineral hardness, used to measure the scratch resistance of various minerals
 Liver scratch test, used by medical professionals to ascertain the location and size of a patient's liver during a physical assessment
 Apley scratch test, a medical test for limitations in motions of the upper extremity measured during a shoulder examination